Plan-d'Aups-Sainte-Baume (Provençal: Lo Plan d’Aups de la Santa Bauma) is a commune in the Var department in the Provence-Alpes-Côte d'Azur region in southeastern France. It lies to the north of the Sainte-Baume mountain range.

History

Second World War

In June 1944, at the aftermath of D-Day when the French Resistance went on an offensive against the German occupiers, the hills near Plan-d'Aups were the site of a bloody battle. Some 200 Maquis had set up a camp there, commanded by SOE agent Robert Burdett. They were attacked by large German forces. Though taken by surprise due to a faulty placing of guards, the Maquis did inflict considerable casualties on the Germans and many of them managed to escape into the surrounding mountains.

Geography

Climate

Plan-d'Aups-Sainte-Baume has a hot-summer Mediterranean climate (Köppen climate classification Csa).

See also
Communes of the Var department

References

Communes of Var (department)